Igor Vladimirovich Aksyonov (born 11 August 1977) is a Russian professional football coach and a former player. He currently works as a conditioning coach with PFC CSKA Moscow.

Club career
He made his debut in the Russian Premier League in 1999 for PFC CSKA Moscow. He played one game in the UEFA Champions League 1999–2000 qualification for PFC CSKA Moscow.

Honours
 Russian Premier League bronze: 1999.

References

1977 births
Sportspeople from Tver
Living people
Russian footballers
Russia under-21 international footballers
FC Arsenal Tula players
PFC CSKA Moscow players
Russian Premier League players
FC Lokomotiv Nizhny Novgorod players
FK Rīga players
Russian expatriate footballers
Expatriate footballers in Latvia
FC Anzhi Makhachkala players
FC Kristall Smolensk players
FC Kuban Krasnodar players
FC Metalist Kharkiv players
Expatriate footballers in Ukraine
FC Zhenis Astana players
Expatriate footballers in Kazakhstan
Association football midfielders